The Baken diamond mine is a diamond mine located along the lower Orange River in South Africa. The mine is owned and operated by Lower Orange River Diamonds. The central processing plant has been operational at Baken since 2001.

There is a waste rock overburden of about 33 million cubic metres.

References
 Trans Hex 

Diamond mines in South Africa
Economy of the Northern Cape
Geography of the Northern Cape
Surface mines in South Africa
Namakwa District Municipality